Today, the phrases "machinist's handbook" or "machinists' handbook" are almost always imprecise references to Machinery's Handbook.

Machinist's handbook may also refer to:

 American Machinists' Handbook a McGraw-Hill reference book published in the early 20th century